Garbage Bin is an Indian cartoon strip created in 2011 by Faisal Mohammed which was first published as a webcomic on Facebook and later added to Instagram. It has amassed more than one million followers on Facebook.

Garbage Bin's protagonist is named Guddu. Supporting characters include Guddu's best friend Shan, his teacher & classmates, and family—made of his father and mother. 

Guddu is depicted as a 10-year-old child in the 1990s, whose middle-class wit tickles readers and school scenes leave them in a nostalgic mood, relating them to their own childhood memories of family, school, and friends. Garbage Bin gags make one realize that every middle-class child during the 1990s lived a similar life with almost the same everyday incidents and accidents.

Guddu is inspired by cartoonist Faisal Mohammed, and Shan is inspired by his close friend and Garbage Bin Studios co-founder, Md. Shan Nawaz.  With a modest beginning in 2011, the comic now has over 900k Facebook followers.

References

External links
 Garbage Bin on Facebook

2010s webcomics
2011 webcomic debuts
Indian webcomics